Highland Creek may refer to:

Rivers

Ontario, Canada
Highland Creek (Toronto), in Scarborough, which flows into Lake Ontario
Highland Creek, in Kenora and Rainy River districts, a tributary of the Little Turtle River
Highland Creek, in Lambton County, which flows into Lake Huron
Highland Creek, in Renfrew County, a tributary of the Madawaska River (Ontario)

United States
Highland Creek, a tributary of the Rubicon River (California)

Settlements
Highland Creek, Toronto, in Ontario, Canada
Highland Creek (Charlotte neighborhood), a large subdivision in southern North Carolina, United States.